Wiesnerella is the only genus in the liverwort family Wiesnerellaceae, in the order Marchantiales.

References

Marchantiales
Marchantiales genera